The Nebraska Cornhuskers baseball team competes as part of NCAA Division I, representing the University of Nebraska–Lincoln in the Big Ten Conference.

In its early years, Nebraska's program cycled through head coaches, most of whom led the program for a single year. The Cornhuskers competed as an independent until 1929, when John Rhodes led the team to the Big Six championship. W. W. Knight, hired forty-four years after the program's first season of competition, was Nebraska's first head coach to hold the position for more than three years.

After decades of heavy coaching turnover, the hire of Tony Sharpe in 1947 brought stability to the program for the first time; Sharpe and his successor John Sanders led Nebraska for a combined fifty-one years. However, this consistency did not translate to on-field success, as the two coaches combined for just three NCAA Tournament appearances. NU's first national success arrived with the hire of Dave Van Horn in 1998, who took the program to its first College World Series appearances in 2001 and 2002. When Van Horn resigned to return to his alma mater Arkansas after the 2002 season, assistant Mike Anderson succeeded him and led NU to a program-record fifty-seven wins and another College World Series appearance in 2005.

Nebraska has been coached by Will Bolt since 2020.

Coaching history

Notes

References

Nebraska Cornhuskers
 
Nebraska Cornhuskers baseball coaches